Edward A. Goldman is a Talmudic scholar. He is Professor Emeritus Israel and Ida Bettan Chair in Midrash and Homiletics at the Hebrew Union College. He is the editor of the Hebrew Union College Annual.

Goldman studied at Harvard College, the Hebrew University of Jerusalem and the Hebrew Union College.

References

Living people
Year of birth missing (living people)
Talmudists
Academic journal editors
Hebrew Union College – Jewish Institute of Religion alumni
Hebrew Union College – Jewish Institute of Religion faculty
Harvard College alumni
Hebrew University of Jerusalem alumni